John Stringer may refer to:

 John Bentley Stringer (1928–1979), British computer pioneer
 John Stringer (composer), British composer, oboist, conductor and academic